Herbert William Bowden, Baron Aylestone,  (20 January 1905 – 30 April 1994) was a British Labour politician.

Early life
Born in Cardiff, Wales, Bowden was the son of Herbert Bowden, a baker, and his wife Henrietta (née Gould). Bowden later recalled that "I was born with smell of bread in my nostrils and lived around the bakehouses. I always had one thought in mind – never to be employed in them." After completing elementary school he opened a tobacconist's shop, but following the collapse of his business during the Great Depression he left Cardiff to look for work elsewhere, eventually becoming a radio salesman in Leicester.

Political career
Bowden had been a member of the Independent Labour Party (ILP) as a young man, but sided with the Labour Party when the two parties disagreed over how best to support the Republican faction in the Spanish Civil War. In 1938, he was elected to sit on Leicester City Council, and later that year became president of the city's Labour Party. Having served as a flying officer in the Royal Air Force during World War II, Bowden was elected MP for Leicester South at the 1945 general election, and then for Leicester South West from 1950 until his retirement from the House of Commons in 1967. He was appointed a whip in 1949 and a Lord Commissioner of the Treasury in 1950. From 1951 onwards, he was Deputy Chief Whip, then Chief Whip throughout Labour's years in opposition. Bowden was appointed a Commander of the Order of the British Empire (CBE) in the 1953 Coronation Honours.

Bowden was regarded as being on the right of the Labour Party, and supported Hugh Gaitskell in his battles with the left before switching his allegiance to Harold Wilson following Gaitskell's death in 1963. He was, as the Daily Telegraph later commented, somewhat "traditional" in his mindset, representing the "authentic... old hat, passé, reactionary voice of the Labour Party", but his forthright attitude to party discipline (which had earned him the sobriquet "The Sergeant Major" amongst Labour MPs) made him an efficient and much-respected parliamentary whip. Thus, when Labour returned to power in 1964, Bowden was appointed Leader of the House of Commons and Lord President of the Council, having become a Privy Counsellor in 1962. In 1966, he was moved to the new post of Secretary of State for Commonwealth Affairs, serving until 1967. On 1 September 1967 he succeeded Lord Hill as chairman of the Independent Television Authority.

On 20 September 1967, Bowden was created a life peer as Baron Aylestone, of Aylestone in the City of Leicester, taking the Labour whip. He was appointed a member of the Order of the Companions of Honour in the 1975 Birthday Honours, and from 1984 to 1992 was a Deputy Speaker of the House of Lords. To many people's surprise, he left Labour to join the Social Democratic Party (SDP) upon the latter's foundation in 1981. Remaining with the SDP throughout the party's existence, after its demise in 1988 he chose to follow David Owen's breakaway 'continuing' SDP rather than support the merger with the Liberals. When the Owenite rump itself dissolved two years later, Aylestone sat in the Lords as an 'Independent Social Democrat' before joining the Liberal Democrats in 1992.

Death
Lord Aylestone died in 1994, aged 89, in Worthing, Sussex, and was survived by his second wife and a daughter from his first marriage.

References

1905 births
1994 deaths
Politicians from Cardiff
Bowden, Herbert
Social Democratic Party (UK) life peers
Social Democratic Party (UK, 1988) peers
Liberal Democrats (UK) life peers
Bowden, Herbert
British Secretaries of State for Commonwealth Affairs
Lord Presidents of the Council
Members of the Privy Council of the United Kingdom
Commanders of the Order of the British Empire
Members of the Order of the Companions of Honour
ITV people
Bowden, Herbert
Bowden, Herbert
Bowden, Herbert
Bowden, Herbert
Bowden, Herbert
Bowden, Herbert
Bowden, Herbert
UK MPs who were granted peerages
Life peers created by Elizabeth II
Leaders of the House of Commons of the United Kingdom
Bowden, Herbert
Labour Party (UK) councillors
Royal Air Force personnel of World War II
People from Aylestone
Ministers in the Attlee governments, 1945–1951
Ministers in the Wilson governments, 1964–1970